"Radio Heart" is a song written by Stephen Allen Davis and Dennis Morgan, and recorded by American country music artist Charly McClain.  It was released in January 1985 as the first single and title track from the album Radio Heart.  The song was Charly McClain's second number one on the country chart as a solo artist.  The single was her final number one and spent one week at number one and spent a total of fourteen weeks on the country chart.

Charts

Weekly charts

Year-end charts

References
 

1985 singles
1985 songs
Charly McClain songs
Songs written by Dennis Morgan (songwriter)
Song recordings produced by Norro Wilson
Epic Records singles
Songs written by Stephen Allen Davis